Nepal Armed Police Force School was established in 2006 and is run by Armed Police Force (Nepal). It is located at Champadevi of Kirtipur, Nepal. The school has over 21% of female students.  The school is run as a non-profit organization and funded by the Armed Police Force Welfare Fund. The curriculum in the school is in English. The school serves the children of APF personnel and civilians. It offers classes from Grade 4 to high school (10+2).

External links

References

2006 establishments in Nepal
Buildings and structures in Bagmati Province
Educational institutions established in 2006
Elementary and primary schools in Nepal
Kathmandu District
Secondary schools in Nepal